Major General Orlando Llenza (July 1, 1930 – March 11, 2021) was the second Puerto Rican to reach the rank of Major General (two-star General) in the United States Air Force. Llenza served as commander of the Puerto Rico Air National Guard (PRANG).

Early years
Llenza was born to Maria Isabel Lopez and Harry B. Llenza in Santurce  barrio in the municipality of San Juan, Puerto Rico the capital of Puerto Rico, where he received his primary and secondary education.  In 1947, he graduated from Central High School and applied for admission at Georgia Tech. In 1951 he earned his bachelor's degree in Architecture and a commission as 2nd lieutenant through the Air Force ROTC program.

Military career
Llenza began his military career as an enlisted airman in the United States Air Force Reserve in 1946 and in 1951 joined the regular United States Air Force as a 2nd lieutenant assigned to Reese Air Force Base in Lubbock County, Texas. He attended USAF Undergraduate Pilot Training, the Air War College, and Air Command and Staff College in Maxwell Air Force Base, among others.

Korean War

During the Korean War, Llenza flew as a pilot in the 9th Air Refueling Squadron at Davis–Monthan Air Force Base.  During his career he flew the T-6 Texan, B-25 Mitchell, Boeing KB-29M tanker, KC-97 Stratofreighter tanker, T-33 Shooting Star Shooting Star, F-86 Sabre D, E, F and H models, F-104 Starfighter, and the C-47 Skytrain, C-54 Skymaster, C-131 Samaritan transports.

Adjutant General of P.R. National Guard
After leaving active duty, Llenza joined the Puerto Rico Air National Guard. He fulfilled many roles within the 156th Tactical Fighter Group at Muñiz Air National Guard Base including flight leader, squadron commander and group deputy commander for operations. In 1965 Llenza was part of the U.S. action in the Dominican Republic at the start of the Dominican Civil War. Llenza was named Adjutant General of the Puerto Rico National Guard by Governor Carlos Romero Barceló, a position which he held from 1977 to 1983. His promotion to major general in the Air Force Reserve was confirmed by the United States Senate on February 8, 1979. Llenza became the mission director in Ecuador for US AID from 1983 to 1986.  As a civilian he was a successful architect with Llenza & Llenza (the other Llenza was Hector his brother).

Llenza was also the recipient of many awards, including the U.S. Distinguished Service Medal and the National Order of Merit-Ecuador.  General Llenza was the Chairman of the American Veterans' Committee for Puerto Rico Self-Determination. Llenza was a member of the Board of Directors of the United States Council for Puerto Rico Statehood.

After retiring from the Air National Guard, Llenza worked for the United States Agency for International Development as the mission director in Quito, Ecuador, for three years.

Death
Llenza died on March 11, 2021, in Miami, Florida, and was buried at the Puerto Rico National Cemetery in Bayamón, Puerto Rico.

Awards and decorations
Among Llenza's decorations and medals were the following:

   Air Force Distinguished Service Medal
   Meritorious Service Medal
   National Defense Service Medal
   Armed Forces Expeditionary Medal
   Combat Readiness Medal
   Air Force Longevity Service Award
   Armed Forces Reserve Medal (with Bronze Hourglass Device)
   Small Arms Expert Marksmanship Ribbon
   Air Force Training Ribbon
   Puerto Rico Medal for Distinguished Service
   Florida Distinguished Service Medal
   Puerto Rico Civil Disturbance Ribbon
   Puerto Rico Service Medal with two bronce Oak leaf clusters 

Badges:
   Command pilot

Foreign award

National Order of Merit-Ecuador

See also

 List of Puerto Ricans
 List of Puerto Rican military personnel
 Hispanics in the United States Air Force

References

Further reading
 "Puertorriquenos Who Served With Guts, Glory, and Honor. Fighting to Defend a Nation Not Completely Their Own"; by : Greg Boudonck; ;

External links
 Puerto Rico Herald

1930 births
2021 deaths
Air Command and Staff College alumni
Air War College alumni
United States Air Force personnel of the Korean War
American Korean War pilots
Georgia Tech alumni
National Guard (United States) generals
Puerto Rican United States Air Force personnel
Puerto Rican aviators
People from Santurce, Puerto Rico
Puerto Rican military officers
Puerto Rico Adjutant Generals
Recipients of the Air Force Distinguished Service Medal
United States Air Force generals
United States Air Force reservists
Puerto Rico National Guard personnel